The 1996 Badminton Asian Cup was the fourth edition of Badminton Asian Cup. It was held in Seoul, South Korea from 19 to 23 June with total prize money of US$130,000. Host South Korea dominated by winning all the doubles disciplines, while Singles titles were shared between China and Malaysia.

Medalists

Medal table

Results

Semifinals

Finals

Sources

References 

Badminton tournaments in South Korea
1996 in badminton
1996 in South Korean sport
International sports competitions hosted by South Korea